The 1975 Asia Golf Circuit was the 14th season of golf tournaments that comprised the Asia Golf Circuit.

Despite not claiming a tournament victory during the season, Taiwan's Hsieh Min-Nan won his second overall circuit title through consistent high finishes. He prevailed by just half a point from compatriot Kuo Chie-Hsiung, who won three tournaments, as both men finished tied for nineteenth place in the season ending Sobu International Open.

Tournament schedule
The table below shows the 1975 Asian Golf Circuit schedule. The only scheduling change from 1974, was the Thailand and Singapore tournaments swapping places as the third and sixth legs of the circuit.

Final standings
The Asia Golf Circuit operated a points based system to determine the overall circuit champion, with points being awarded in each tournament to the leading players. At the end of the season, the player with the most points was declared the circuit champion, and there was a prize pool to be shared between the top players in the points table.

References

Asia Golf Circuit
Asia Golf Circuit